Dhokha is a 2007 Indian Hindi-language action thriller film directed by Pooja Bhatt, starring Muzammil Ibrahim and Tulip Joshi. Produced by Mukesh Bhatt and featuring music by M. M. Keeravani, the film revolves around a moderate Indian Muslim cop, who wakes up and to his horror, discovers that his wife, who had recently been killed in a bomb blast, is accused of being a suicide bomber and had killed 20 people in the club. This film is based on the novel The Attack  by Yasmina Khadra.

Plot
Inspector Zaid Ahmed (Muzammil Ibrahim) is notified on duty that there has been a bomb blast at a mall. After investigation, it is found out that the suicide bomber responsible was Sara Khan (Tulip Joshi), Zaid's wife. Zaid finds it hard to believe in seeing his wife's dead body and claims to have dropped her at the bus stop. Zaid, who is inspected by the ATS (Anti Terrorism Squad), is called off duty temporarily by ATS Chief Raj Mehra (Gulshan Grover) but stands firm to his statement that his wife could not be the terrorist responsible.

One day he receives a DVD, by post, at home, which consists of his wife's dying testimonial in which she accepts that she is the responsible terrorist. Not believing what he has seen, Zaid decides to visit Sara's grandfather Saeed Noor Bux (Anupam Kher). On meeting him, Saeed reveals a rather shocking story. Sara's father had been arrested by the Local Police and had been beaten as he was suspected of terrorist activities. During the interrogation, he dies. The Police hide his body, claims that he has run to Pakistan and was found guilty of being a terrorist.

When Saeed complains about this incident to higher authorities, Sara, her brother Daanish (Abhay Sachar), and he himself are arrested by the Inspector and are forced to sign a statement that they do not want to investigate this case. Upon refusal, they make nude videos of Sara. After Saeed is forced to sign the statement, the inspector (Ashutosh Rana) asks Saeed and Daanish to go home, takes Sara to a cell while being horny, and rapes her naked. Due to this incident, Sara and her brother start meeting a Molvi (Islamic Preacher) (Munish Makhija), who convinces them to lay down their lives by killing Non-Muslims. While Sara was first in the league, her brother, who has been missing for a month, might follow her.

Zaid, horrified by this tale, tries to find Sarah's brother Danish and finds him when he is being prepared to blast himself in a few days. As a result of chasing him, he finds out the Molvi behind this, and shares harsh words with him. Later he is shown a recording of Daanish accepting the responsibility of another bombing yet to take place. Molvi's men tell Zaid they will let him go after the bombing has happened the following day, but he fights them and escapes to go after Daanish. Zaid finds Daanish at the station about to make a final call to his grandad and convinces him that he will get justice for Sara and their father. Daanish relents and hugs Zaid.

Zaid's rank is restored, and he resumes duty. He then explains to the senior police officers how they force terrorists to be born just because of not being able to give them justice.

It is later shown that the corrupt Inspector is arrested and sentenced. Saeed and Daanish win the case with the help of Zaid.

Cast
 Muzammil Ibrahim as Inspector Zaid Ahmed Khan
 Tulip Joshi as Sarah
 Abhay Sachar as Danish (Sarah's brother)
 Anupam Kher as Saeed (Sarah's grandfather)
 Aushima Sawhney as Nandini (Zaid's ex-girlfriend)
 Gulshan Grover as ATS Chief Raj Mehra
 Ashutosh Rana as Corrupt and guilty police officer
 Priyanka Sharma
 Anupam Shyam
 Bhanu Uday
 Raj Saluja as Adil (Zaid's Best Friend)
 Manish Makhija
 Sunil Kankekar
 Viineet Kumar as Police Inspector

Soundtrack
The songs were composed by M.M. Keeravani, and the songs "Roya Re" and "Kab Tujhe" became popular at that time.

References

External links
 
 
 
 
2000s Hindi-language films
2007 films
Films scored by M. M. Keeravani
Indian action thriller films
Indian action drama films